Orchesella chiantica is a species of slender springtail in the family Entomobryidae. It is a sister taxon to Orchesella villosa, and both can be found on the Italian peninsula.

References

Collembola
Articles created by Qbugbot
Animals described in 1990